Queen Hyogong of the Pyeongchang Yi clan was the wife Mokjo of Joseon and the mother of Ikjo of Joseon. She was also the grandmother of Dojo of Joseon, and the great-grandmother of Hwangjo of Joseon.

Biography
One of her ancestors was Yi Gwang, Prince Baekoh (이광 백오군) from Pyeongchang-gun, Gangwon-do. Because King Sejong disallowed a man and woman from the same clan to marry and disallowed any woman with the surname Yi, she became the only Joseon Queen Consort whom came from a Yi clan (이씨, 李氏) in Joseon history. With Mokjo, she bore him 6 sons.

In 28 July 1392, when Taejo established a new dynasty, she was granted the royal title Hyo-bi (효비, 孝妃; literally: Consort Hyo) along with her husband whom was granted the title King Mok (목왕, 穆王). Later on 22 April 1411, King Taejong, gave her a posthumous name Queen Hyogong (효공왕후, 孝恭王后). Her tomb was located in Alleung, Neung-ri, Gapyeong-myeon, Siheung-gun, Hamgyeongnam-do along with her husband.

Family
Father: Yi Gong-suk (이공숙, 李公肅)
Grandfather: Yi Seong-ro (이성로, 李成老)
Grandmother: Lady Han of the Cheongju Han clan (청주 한씨) – daughter of Han Hyeok (한혁, 韓奕)
Mother: Princess Consort Dolsan of the Jeong clan (돌산군부인 정씨, 突山郡夫人 鄭氏)
Grandfather: Jeong Seok (정석, 鄭碩)
Grandmother: Lady Kim of the Samcheok Kim clan (삼척 김씨) – daughter of Kim In-gue (김인궤)
 Siblings
 Older brother: Yi Won (이원, 李元)
 Sister: Lady Yi (이씨)
 Brother-in-law: Yi Dang-ryeol (이당렬, 李唐烈)
Sister: Lady Yi (이씨)
Husband: Yi Ahn-sa, Mokjo of Joseon (? - 1274) (조선 목조)
 Father-in-law: Yi Yang-mu (이양무, 李陽茂) (? - 1231)
 Mother-in-law: Lady Lee of the Samcheok Lee clan (삼척 이씨, 三陟 李氏)
 Issue
 Son: Yi Eo-seon, Grand Prince Ancheon (이어선 안천대군) (? - 1274)
 Daughter-in-law: Lady Kim of the Gimhae Kim clan (김해 김씨, 金海 金氏); daughter of Kim Nam-ok (김남옥)
 Grandson: Yi Gwang-su, Prince Yeongheung (영흥군 이광수)
 Grandson: Yi Chung-ryang, Prince Gyeongheung (경흥군 이충량)
 Grandson: Yi Jung-ryang, Prince Jinheung (진흥군 이중량)
 Son: Yi Jin, Grand Prince Anwon (이진 안원대군)
 Daughter-in-law: Princess Consort Pyeongsan of the Pyeongsan Shin clan (평산부부인 평산 신씨, 平山府夫人 平山 申氏)
 Grandson: Yi Si, Prince Pyeonghae (평해군 이시)
 Grandson: Yi Bo-ha, Prince Donghae (동해군 이보하)
 Son: Yi Jeong, Grand Prince Anpung (이정 안풍대군)
 Unnamed daughter-in-law 
 Grandson: Yi Hwan, Prince Dongwon (동원군 이환)
 Grandson: Yi Dan, Prince Dongheung (동흥군 이단)
 Grandson: Yi Beob-jang, Prince Dongpyeong (동평군 이법장)
 Son: Yi Haeng-ri, Ikjo of Joseon (이행리 조선 익조)
 Daughter-in-law: Queen Jeongsuk of the Yeongheung Choi clan (정숙왕후 최씨)
 Grandson: Yi Song, Grand Prince Hamwon (함원대군 이송)
 Grandson: Yi Chun, King Dojo (도조대왕 이춘) (? - 1342)
 Grandson: Yi Won, Grand Prince Hamcheon (함천대군 이원)
 Grandson: Yi Go-tae, Grand Prince Hamreung (함릉대군 이고태)
 Grandson: Yi Jeon, Grand Prince Hamyang (함양대군 이전)
 Grandson: Yi Eung-geo, Grand Prince Hamseong (함성대군 이응거)
 Granddaughter: Princess Anui (안의공주)
 Son: Yi Mae-bul, Grand Prince Anchang (이매불 안창대군)
 Son: Yi Gu-su, Grand Prince Anheung (이구수 안흥대군)
 Daughter-in-law: Lady Han of the Cheongju Han clan (청주 한씨, 府夫人 淸州 韓氏)
 Grandson: Yi Dae-ga, Prince Seoreung (서릉군 이대가)
 Grandson: Yi Ban, Prince Seochun (서춘군 이반)
 Grandson: Yi Mal-heul, Prince Seoryeong (서령군 이말흘)
 Grandson: Yi Cheon-gi, Prince Seocheong (서청군 이천기)

References

13th-century Korean people
Royal consorts of the Joseon dynasty
Korean queens consort
Year of birth unknown
Year of death unknown
Date of birth unknown
Date of death unknown